Stephane Faatiarau (born 13 March 1990) is a soccer player from Tahiti currently playing for A.S. Central Sport and for Tahiti national football team.
He was part of the Tahiti squad at the 2013 FIFA Confederations Cup in Brazil.

International goals

References

External links
 
 

1990 births
Living people
French Polynesian footballers
Tahiti international footballers
2013 FIFA Confederations Cup players
Association football defenders